The Kromlau Azalea and Rhododendron Park is an  landscaped park in Gablenz, Germany, built during the nineteenth century, reportedly on the grounds of a former feudal estate by Friedrich Herrmann Rötschke. Following World War II, the park was nationalized by the government, and has no admission fee (though there is a nominal parking fee).  The park is an example of an English landscape garden, and it contains many small ponds and lakes. 
It is known for the Rakotzbrücke, a bridge especially built to create a circle when it is reflected in the water beneath it.

Rakotzbrücke
The Rakotzbrücke (also known as Teufelsbrücke, meaning "the Devil's Bridge") is 7.8 metres long, 6.5 metres wide and spans Rakotz lake. The radius of the inner arch is 2.2 metres, and the outer radius is 3.4 metres long. The abutments measure 3.6 metres and the side weights measure 2.0 meters The bridge features artificially-formed basalt columns selected and shipped from distant quarries. It was commissioned in 1860 "by the knight of the local town", Friedrich Herrmann Rötschke (1805-1893).

The bridge was renovated in 2018 and 2019,  though it remains forbidden to cross the bridge, for the safety of the public and the bridge.

References

External links

Protected areas of Saxony
Parks in Germany
Görlitz (district)